The Harkness Fellowship (previously known as the Commonwealth Fund Fellowship) is a program run by the Commonwealth Fund of New York City. This fellowship was established to reciprocate the Rhodes Scholarships and enable Fellows from several countries to spend time studying in the United States. 

Recipients of the scholarship include a president of the International Court of Justice; former Chairman and CEO of Salomon Brothers; a former Vice-Chancellor of the University of Cambridge; the controller of BBC Radio 4; the editor of the Sunday Times; former directors of the Medical Research Council, the London School of Economics and the General Medical Council; and a vice president of Microsoft.

History 
The Commonwealth Fund is a philanthropic foundation established in the United States by Anna Harkness in 1918. Her son, Edward Stephen Harkness, initiated the Commonwealth Fund Fellowships in 1925.  These were intended to reciprocate the Rhodes Scholarships by enabling British graduates to study in the United States. In 1927 the scheme was widened by the creation of Dominion Fellowships available to graduates from universities in Australia, New Zealand, Canada and South Africa. In 1929 a further category of Dominion Civil Service Fellowships was established. The awards were tenable from nine to fifteen months and candidates were to be under the age of 40.

In 1961 the Fellowships were renamed the Harkness Fellowships. In addition to the Civil Service Fellowships, a new category of General Fellowships was set up, open to people in the fields of business, banking, politics, creative arts and journalism. The maximum tenure period was extended to 21 months.

Since June 1997, the activities of the Harkness Fellowships have been limited to the field of health care. The Fellowships are now considered one of the most prestigious award programs in health policy, and accept Fellows from Australia, Canada (known as Harkness Associates), Germany, the Netherlands, New Zealand, Norway (as of 2009), Switzerland (as of 2009) and the United Kingdom. They are tenable for twelve months.

Current fellowship program
Harkness Fellows in Health Care Policy & Practice spend a year conducting research at American institutions such as Harvard University, Brigham and Women's Hospital, Columbia University, Stanford University, Johns Hopkins University, Kaiser Permanente, or the Veterans Health Administration.  They gain an in-depth understanding of the U.S. health care system and policy challenges, enhance their research skills, and develop contacts and opportunities for ongoing international collaboration.

In addition, Fellows attend a program of seminars during the year:
September: Orientation and Qualitative Research Methodology Workshop
November: International Symposium on Healthcare Policy, bringing together Health Ministers from Australia, Canada, Germany, the Netherlands, New Zealand, the United Kingdom, and the United States
February: Washington Policy Briefing held on Capitol Hill with members of the United States Congress and senior government officials
May: Canadian Policy Briefing on Federal and provincial health
June: Final Reporting Seminar and the AcademyHealth Annual Research Meeting

Administration and funding 
The programme is funded and administered by the Commonwealth Fund of New York City, with additional support for some Fellows coming from external bodies, namely:

B. Braun Stiftung and Robert Bosch Stiftung (Germany)
Canadian Health Services Research Foundation (Canada)
Careum Foundation (Switzerland)
Nuffield Trust and the National Institute for Health and Care Research (UK)
The Ministry of Health, Welfare and Sport (Netherlands)

Notable alumni

Professor David Armitage, transnational historian
Professor Eric Ashby, Baron Ashby, British botanist and educator
Professor Peter Atkins, professor of chemistry at Oxford University
Professor Sir Jonathan Bate, Shakespeare scholar and biographer
Professor Patrick Bateson, emeritus professor of ethology at Cambridge University
Professor Tim Beaglehole, chancellor of the Victoria University of Wellington
J.G. Farrell, novelist.
Sir Harrison Birtwistle, composer
Professor Colin Blakemore, neurobiologist and former chief executive of the Medical Research Council
Sir Ronald Bottrall, Cornish poet
Professor Hugh Brogan, historian and biographer
Sir George Malcolm Brown, geologist
Professor Sir Roy Calne British surgeon who performed the world's first liver, heart, and lung transplant
Sir Graeme Catto, president of the General Medical Council
Reverend Professor Sarah Coakley, Edward Mallinckrodt Jr. Professor of Divinity at the Harvard Divinity School
Alistair Cooke KBE, journalist and broadcaster of Letter from America
Professor Sir Steven Cowley Theoretical Physicist and Director of the Princeton Plasma Physics Laboratory. 
 Dr Nigel H Croft, Quality Expert, and key architect of the ISO quality management standards (ISO 9001)
Professor Nicholas J. Cull, historian
Professor Marcus Cunliffe, former visiting professor of American studies at Harvard University
Mark Damazer, controller of BBC Radio 4 and BBC 7
Sir Howard Davies, director of the London School of Economics and Political Science
Sir Peter Maxwell Davies, composer, conductor and Master of the Queen's Music
Professor Glyn Davis, vice-chancellor of the University of Melbourne
Stuart Devlin, goldsmith and jeweller to Her Majesty the Queen
Dr Jennifer Dixon, CBE, FRCP, FFPH, Chief Executive of the Health Foundation
Professor John Montfort Dunn, emeritus professor of political theory at King's College, Cambridge
Professor John Dupré, philosopher
Freeman Dyson, scientist
Sir Harold Evans, former editor of the Sunday Times
Sir Terry Farrell, architect of the MI6 Building
Professor Pamela Gillies, principal and vice-chancellor of Glasgow Caledonian University
Fiona Godlee, editor, BMJ
Lawrence Goldman, historian and editor of the Oxford Dictionary of National Biography
Anthony Green RA, painter
Karl W. Gruenberg,  British mathematician
Professor Jonathan Harvey (composer)
Tom Hayhoe, chairman of West London NHS Trust
Alastair Hetherington, editor of The Guardian, 1956–1975
Tony Hey CBE, academic and corporate vice-president of technical computing at Microsoft
Dame Rosalyn Higgins, president of the International Court of Justice
Ronald Hilton, British-American academic who helped uncover the CIA’s clandestine preparations for the Bay of Pigs invasion
Peter Jenkins, journalist
The Hon. Shane Jones, New Zealand politician
Professor Ralph Kekwick FRS Biochemist
Bridget Kendall MBE, diplomatic correspondent for the BBC
Graeme Koehne, Australian composer and chair of the Australia Council's music board
Rem Koolhaas, architect and principal of OMA
Professor Nicola LeFanu, composer
Professor Koen Lenaerts, professor of European Law and judge at the European Court of Justice
Sue Lenier, English poet and playwright
Anthony Lester, Baron Lester of Herne Hill, politician
Michael L'Estrange AO, Australian public servant and former Australian High Commissioner to the United Kingdom
Gwyneth Lewis, Welsh poet, the first National Poet for Wales
Professor David Lodge, British author
Piers Mackesy, military historian
Dr Martin Marshall, Chair of the Royal College of General Practitioners (RCGP)
Sir Deryck Maughan, former Chairman and CEO of Salomon Brothers
Keith Milow, artist
Julian Mitchell, FRSL, playwright, screenwriter, novelist
Jan Morris CBE, historian and travel writer
Professor Geoff Mulgan, former director of policy at 10 Downing Street and director of the Prime Minister's Strategy Unit
Baron Murray of Newhaven, British academic
Sara Nathan OBE, broadcast journalist and regulator
Julia Neuberger, Baroness Neuberger, rabbi and social reformer
Peter Nicholls (writer), Australian literary scholar and critic
John Nicolson (journalist and broadcaster)
Professor Claus Offe, political sociologist
Professor Derek Parfit, philosopher
Baron Penney, physicist responsible for the development of British nuclear technology
Peter Phillips, artist and pioneer of pop art
Professor Randolph Quirk, British linguist, former Quain Professor at University College London.
Professor Dame Anne Marie Rafferty DBE, British nurse, currently Professor of Nursing Policy Florence Nightingale School of Nursing and Midwifery, King's College London and President of the Royal College of Nursing, UK.
Peter Sands, Group Chief Executive of Standard Chartered plc
 Malcolm Singer, composer, conductor and Director of Music, Yehudi Menuhin School
Richard Smith, painter and printmaker
Randolph Stow, Australian writer
Andrew Sullivan, writer, blogger and gay rights activist
Professor Barry Trimmer, biologist and creator of the world's first soft-bodied robot
Professor Rudolf G. Wagner, sinologist
Professor Sir David Wallace, director of the Isaac Newton Institute for Mathematical Sciences in Cambridge and master of Churchill College, Cambridge
Professor Denis Weaire, Irish physicist
Brett Whiteley, Australian artist
Professor Sir David Glyndwr Tudor Williams, former Vice-Chancellor of the University of Cambridge
Professor Jonathan Wolff, former chair of philosophy at University College London.
Adrian Wooldridge, Washington bureau chief and "Lexington" columnist for The Economist
Professor Esmond Wright, historian
Hugo Young, British journalist
Professor Sir Erik Christopher Zeeman, mathematician
Ruth Louisa Cohen CBE, economist
Professor Christina Pagel, Health services researcher and mathematician, Director of the UCL Clinical Operational Research Unit

See also
Churchill Scholarship
Fulbright Scholarship
Gates Cambridge Scholarship
Rhodes Scholarship
Marshall Scholarship
Mitchell Scholarship
Kennedy Scholarship

References and notes

External links
Harkness Fellowships
Harkness Fellows Association and Transatlantic Trust (Alumni Association)

Awards established in 1925
Fellowships
Scholarships in the United States
1925 establishments in New York (state)
Harkness family